Lissotis is a genus of bird in the bustard family, Otididae. Some authorities, such as the IUCN, consider it part of Eupodotis; the separation adopted here follows the Handbook of the Birds of the World.

It contains the following species, both restricted to Africa:

References 

 
Taxa named by Ludwig Reichenbach